The British Association of Aesthetic Plastic Surgeons is a British surgical organisation based at the Royal College of Surgeons of England premises in London, established as the British Society of Aesthetic Plastic Surgeons in 1979.

Mary O'Brien is the president .

In April 2022 the association  performed an audit and discovered that the number of patients being treated for serious complications following cosmetic surgery abroad in the last four years had increased by 44% in 2021.

References

Surgical organisations based in the United Kingdom
Plastic surgery organizations